Anouar EL Ghannam (born July 6, 1990), known by his stage name AnoGhan, is a Moroccan singer-songwriter. He is one of the first artists to sing Moroccan R&B and pop inspired by American artists such as Ne-Yo, Usher and Chris Brown.

Biography
El Ghannam, known by his stage name AnoGhan, was born July 6, 1990, in Casablanca, Morocco. His music is a mixture of American style and Moroccan lyrics. AnoGhan's first song "A'alach" released in 2006. He released "Nbghiik" in 2009. He returned to the music scene on June 2, 2011, with a Moroccan R&B album Be3d fra9. After a long absence, AnoGhan returned with a single in October 2012 titled "Hassi Biya" changing his genre from R&B to Pop/Dance.

AnoGhan stopped all his musical activities until the beginning of the year 2018, when he launched a song under the name "Visa", the song had over 30,000 views in 24 hours.

Discography

Albums 
 Ba3d L'fra9 (2011)

Singles
"A'alach" (2006)
"Nbghiik" (2009)
"Ghadara" (2010)
"Happy New Year Feat SevenProd AllStars" (2010)
"Hassi Biya" (2012)
"Walou" (2016)
"Visa feat. Oussama Ghannam" (2018)

References

External links 

  AnoGhan on MTV.com
  Skyrock 
 

1990 births
Living people
21st-century Moroccan male singers
Moroccan pop singers
Musicians from Casablanca